Marlina Flassy (born 1968) is an Indonesian anthropologist, who is the first woman to hold a deanship at Cenderawasih University, and is the first woman and indigenous Papuan to be appointed Dean of the Faculty of Social and Political Sciences there. In 2015 the Indonesian Ministry of Research and Technology awarded her its Golden Pin Award.

Biography 
Flassy was born on 15 March 1968 in Seribau, near Teminabuan in the province of West Papua. She attended YPK Kotaraja Junior High School and then FX Taruna Dharma Kotaraja Catholic High School. She studied for an undergraduate degree in anthropology at Cenderawasih University in Jayapura, graduating in 1995. In 1996 she began work as a lecturer at the same university teaching anthropology, ethnography, folklore, amongst other subjects. She subsequently studied for her Master's degree at Gadjah Mada University in Yogyakarta, graduating in 2002. She studied for her PhD at the University of Gottingen in Germany, graduating in 2015. She is editor of the journal Jurnal Antropologi Papua.

In 2021 she was appointed Dean of the Faculty of Social and Political Sciences; she is the first woman and the first indigenous Papuan to hold the role. She is also the first woman to hold any deanship at Cenderawasih University. She had previously held the role of Chair of the Department of Anthropology. In 2019 she was appointed Chair of the Cenderawasih University’s Center for Gender and Child Studies (PGSA). Her research interests include: women in West Papua, the Mooi people, the Napan-Wainame people, the Maybrat community and gender and health equality in West Papua. She collaborated with the Indonesian Minister of Women’s Empowerment and Child Protection to produce a research report entitled the ‘Profile of women and children in Papua Province’. One example of the research was to reveal that in 2017 there were 98 reported cases of violence against women and children, a figure that did not reflect women in Papua's lived experience.

In 2015 the Indonesian Ministry of Research and Technology awarded her its Golden Pin Award, marking her contributions to women's rights and anthropology.

Awards 

 Golden Pin Award [Penghargaan Peniti Emas] (2015)
 Young Community Care Researcher (2004)
 Achievement Image of Papuan Women’s Charisma (2004)

Selected publications 

 Sapioper, H., Flassy, M., & Ilham, I. (30 April 2021). Kualitas Pelayanan Sertifikat Tanah Hak Milik di Kantor Pertanahan Kabupaten Jayapura. Jurnal Borneo Administrator, 17(1), 89-110.
 Flassy, Marlina. "Membangun Jati Diri Suku Tehit Kabupaten Sorong Selatan Papua Barat." CENDERAWASIH: Jurnal Antropologi Papua 1.1 (2020): 1-7.
 Flassy, Marlina. "Deficit of Woman Human Right in Papua Province." Humanities and Social Science Research 2.2 (2019).
 Greifeld, Katarina, D. W. J. H. van Oosterhout, and Marlina Flassy. "Women and Child Health and Malaria in Papua (Keerom and Merauke). A Qualitative Study (KAP)." Bulletin of Health Studies 34.2 (2006): 46-46.
 FLASSY, Marlina. Perubahan sistem perkawinan pada suku bangsa Meybrat di Sorong tanah Papua dalam perspektif gender. Diss. Universitas Gadjah Mada, 2002.

References

External links 

 YouTube: MARLINA FLASSY:CINTA PAPUA JANGAN CINTA ALAMNYA SAJA TETAPI MANUSIA PAPUA JUGA. (interview)

1968 births
Living people
People from Southwest Papua
Indonesian anthropologists
Women anthropologists
West Papuan people
Indonesian women academics
Women deans (academic)
Cenderawasih University alumni
Gadjah Mada University alumni
University of Göttingen alumni